The Mutual Broadcasting System (commonly referred to simply as Mutual; sometimes referred to as MBS, Mutual Radio or the Mutual Radio Network) was an American commercial radio network in operation from 1934 to 1999. In the golden age of U.S. radio drama, Mutual was best known as the original network home of The Lone Ranger and The Adventures of Superman and as the long-time radio residence of The Shadow. For many years, it was a national broadcaster for Major League Baseball (including the All-Star Game and World Series), the National Football League, and Notre Dame Fighting Irish football. From the mid-1930s and until the retirement of the network in 1999, Mutual ran a highly respected news service accompanied by a variety of popular commentary shows. Mutual pioneered the nationwide late night call-in talk radio program in the late 1970s, introducing the country to Larry King and later Jim Bohannon.

In the 1970s, acting in much the same style as rival ABC Radio had splitting their network in 1968, Mutual launched four sister radio networks: Mutual Black Network (MBN) (initially launched as "Mutual Reports"), which evolved to today's American Urban Radio Networks (AURN); Mutual Cadena Hispánica (or in English, "Mutual Spanish Network"); Mutual Southwest Network; and Mutual Progressive Network (later re-branded "Mutual Lifestyle Radio" in 1980, then retired in 1983).

Of the four national networks of American radio's classic era, Mutual had for decades the largest number of affiliates, but the least certain financial position (which prevented Mutual from expanding into television broadcasting after World War II, as NBC, CBS and ABC did). For the first 18 years of its existence, Mutual was owned and operated as a cooperative (a system similar to that of today's National Public Radio), setting the network apart from its corporate owned competitors. Mutual's member stations shared their own original programming, transmission and promotion expenses, and advertising revenues. From December 30, 1936, when it debuted in the West, the Mutual Broadcasting System had affiliates from coast to coast. Its business structure would change after General Tire assumed majority ownership in 1952 through a series of regional and individual station acquisitions.

Once General Tire sold the network in 1957 to a syndicate led by Dr. Armand Hammer, Mutual's ownership was largely disconnected from the stations it served, leading to a more conventional, top-down model of program production and distribution. Due to the multiple sales of the network that followed, Mutual was once described in Broadcasting magazine as "often traded". After a group that involved Hal Roach Studios purchased Mutual from Hammer's group, the new executive team was charged with accepting money to use Mutual as a vehicle for foreign propaganda while the network suffered significant financial losses and affiliate defections. Concurrently filing for Chapter 11 bankruptcy and sold twice in the span of four months for purposes of raising enough money to remain operational, the network's reputation was severely damaged but soon rebounded under succeeding owner 3M Company. Sold to private interests in 1966 and again to Amway in 1977, Mutual purchased two radio stations in New York and Chicago entering the 1980s, only to sell them after Amway's interest in broadcasting began to fade. Radio syndicator Westwood One acquired Mutual in 1985 and NBC Radio in 1987, merging the two networks together; throughout the 1990s, Mutual was gradually assimilated into Westwood One's operations until the name was finally retired.

History

1934–1935: The launch of Mutual
Attempts at establishing cooperatively owned radio networks had been made since the 1920s. In 1929, a group of four radio stations in the major markets of New York City, Chicago, Cincinnati, and Detroit organized into a loose confederation known as the Quality Network. Five years later (in 1934), a similar or identical group of stations founded the Mutual Broadcasting System. Mutual's original participating stations were WOR–Newark, New Jersey, just outside New York (owned by the Bamberger Broadcasting Service, a division of R.H. Macy and Company; in 1949, WOR-TV would begin broadcasting and Bamberger would be renamed General Teleradio, due to General Tire & Rubber's increased investment in the TV station), WGN–Chicago (owned by WGN Inc., a subsidiary of the Chicago Tribune), WXYZ–Detroit (owned by Kunsky-Trendle Broadcasting), and WLW–Cincinnati (owned by the Crosley Radio Company). The network was organized on September 29, 1934, with the members contracting for telephone-line transmission facilities and agreeing to collectively enter into contracts with advertisers for their networked shows. WOR and WGN, based in the two largest markets and providing the bulk of the programming, were the acknowledged leaders of the group. On October 29, 1934, Mutual Broadcasting System, Inc. was incorporated, with Bamberger and WGN Inc. each holding 50 percent of the stock—five each of the ten total shares.

The three national radio networks already in operation—the Columbia Broadcasting System and the National Broadcasting Company's Red and Blue—were corporate controlled: programming was produced by the network (or by advertising agencies of program sponsors that purchased airtime on the network) and distributed to affiliates, most of which were independently owned. In contrast, the Mutual Broadcasting System was run as a true cooperative venture, with programming produced by and shared between the group's members. The majority of the early programming, from WOR and WGN, consisted of musical features and inexpensive dramatic serials. WOR had The Witch's Tale, a horror anthology series whose "hunner-an'-thirteen-year-old" narrator invited listeners to "douse all [the] lights. Now draw up to the fire an' gaze into the embers ...gaaaaze into 'em deep!... an' soon ye'll be across the seas, in th' jungle land of Africa ... hear that chantin' and them savage drums?" WGN contributed the popular comedy series Lum and Abner. Detroit's WXYZ provided The Lone Ranger, which had debuted in 1933 and was already in demand. It is often claimed that Mutual was launched primarily as a vehicle for the Western serial, but Lum and Abner was no less popular at the time. What WLW brought was sheer power; billing itself as "The Nation's Station," in May 1934 it had begun night broadcasting at a massive 500,000 watts, ten times the clear-channel standard.

On May 24, 1935, the network aired its inaugural live event—the first-ever night baseball game, between the Cincinnati Reds and the Philadelphia Phillies. In September, WXYZ dropped out to join NBC Blue, though contractual obligations kept The Lone Ranger on Mutual, airing three times a week, through spring 1942. The hole in the Detroit market was immediately filled by CKLW in Windsor, Ontario, just across the river. In October, the network began a decades-long run as broadcaster of baseball's World Series, with airtime responsibilities shared between WGN's Bob Elson and Quin Ryan and WLW's Red Barber (NBC and CBS also carried the series that year; the Fall Classic would air on all three networks through 1938). Mutual broadcast its first Notre Dame football game that autumn as well, beginning another relationship that would last for decades. As an income-generating business, the Mutual network was a modest endeavor at the start: in the first eleven months of 1935, the cooperative garnered $1.1 million in advertising, compared to NBC's $28.3 million and CBS's $15.8 million.

Late 1930s: National expansion
In the fall of 1936, Mutual lost another of its founding members when WLW departed. The network, however, was in the midst of a major expansion: the first outside group of stations to sign on with Mutual was John Shepard's Colonial Network with its Boston flagship station, WAAB, and thirteen affiliates around New England. There was good reason for this affiliation: Shepard had been involved with the founding of Mutual, and served on its board of directors. Cleveland's WGAR also became an affiliate, albeit a dual one, as they also held a primary NBC Blue hookup. WGAR was joined by five other Midwestern stations: KWK–St. Louis, Mo.; KSO–Des Moines, Iowa; WMT–Cedar Rapids, Iowa; KOIL–Omaha, Neb.; and KFOR–Lincoln, Neb. The big prize came in December, when the Don Lee Network, the leading regional web on the West Coast, left CBS to become a central participant in Mutual. Don Lee brought its four owned-and-operated stations—KHJ–Los Angeles, KFRC–San Francisco, KGB–San Diego, and KDB–Santa Barbara—along with six California affiliates and, via shortwave hookup, two more in Hawaii. Mutual now had a nationwide presence. During 1936, as well, an offer by Warner Bros. to purchase the network was apparently made and rejected.

In January 1937, ownership of WAAB was consolidated with that of another Boston station controlled by Shepard: WNAC was flagship of the Yankee Network, a circuit of New England radio stations whose membership partially overlapped with that of Colonial. Yankee flagship WNAC had been an affiliate of CBS Radio, changing affiliation to NBC Red later in 1937 when CBS purchased WEEI in that city. The Texas Network soon added twenty-three more stations to the Mutual affiliate roster. WGAR dropped both their Mutual and NBC Blue affiliations on September 26, 1937, to take CBS exclusively; in turn, WJAY (co-owned with WHK by the United Broadcasting Company, part of The Plain Dealer business) joined Mutual and changed calls to WCLE. The Mutual affiliation in Cleveland moved again in the fall of 1942 from WCLE to WHK, temporarily displacing Blue programming from the market entirely. By the end of 1938, Mutual had 74 exclusive affiliates; though the two leading radio network companies discouraged dual hookups, Mutual shared another 25 affiliates with NBC and 5 with CBS. The total of 104 affiliates put Mutual not far behind the leaders. Because of the corporate strength behind NBC and CBS, however, and the fact that the lion's share of the most powerful stations in the country had already signed with them before Mutual's emergence (the exceptional, and soon departed, WLW aside), the cooperative network would be at a permanent disadvantage.

Programming: The Shadow and diverse political voices

On the programming front, 1936 saw Mutual launch the first network advice show, The Good Will Hour, hosted by John J. Anthony and sponsored by physical culture guru Bernarr Macfadden. The program was a new take on Ask Mister Anthony, which had aired on a local New York station in 1932, "dedicated to helping the sufferers from an antiquated and outmoded domestic relations code." Anthony, whose real name was Lester Kroll, brought a wealth of relevant experience to his work—he had once been jailed for failing to make alimony payments. In July 1937 came the premiere of a seven-part adaptation of Les Misérables, produced, written, and directed by Orson Welles and featuring many of his Mercury Theatre performers—Mercury's first appearance on the air. September 26, 1937, proved a particularly momentous date: that evening, The Shadow came to Mutual. The show would become a mainstay of the network for more than a decade and a half and one of the most popular programs in radio history. For the first year of its Mutual run, Welles provided the voice of The Shadow and his newly created alter ego, Lamont Cranston. He played the part anonymously at first. But, as one chronicler put it, "nothing to do with Welles could remain a secret for very long."

In April 1938, the network picked up The Green Hornet from former member WXYZ. Mutual gave the twice-a-week series its first national exposure until November 1939, when it switched to NBC Blue. (The series would return very briefly to Mutual in the fall of 1940). Mutual also provided the national launching pad for Kay Kyser and his Kollege of Musical Knowledge radio show. Kyser's enormous success at Mutual soon allowed his show to move to NBC and its much larger audience. By May 1939, Mutual was broadcasting the Indianapolis 500. That autumn, Mutual won exclusive broadcast rights to the World Series. As described in a 1943 Supreme Court ruling upholding the regulatory power of the Federal Communications Commission, Mutual "offered this program of outstanding national interest to stations throughout the country, including NBC and CBS affiliates in communities having no other stations. CBS and NBC immediately invoked the 'exclusive affiliation' clauses of their agreements with these stations, and as a result thousands of persons in many sections of the country were unable to hear the broadcasts of the games." This was the first example given in the ruling of "abuses" perpetrated by the two leading broadcast companies.

Mutual also began building a reputation as a strong news service, rivaling the industry leaders in quality if not budget. The broadcasts of WOR reporter Gabriel Heatter from the Lindbergh kidnapping "trial of the century" in 1935, heard over Mutual, were highly regarded; Heatter soon had his own regularly scheduled newscast, aired nationally five nights a week. In 1936, also via WOR, Mutual began broadcasting the reports of news commentator Raymond Gram Swing, who became one of the country's leading voices on foreign affairs. In November 1937, conservative commentator Fulton Lewis Jr., heard five nights weekly from Mutual affiliate WOL, became the first national news personality to broadcast out of Washington, D.C.; he would remain with the network until his death almost three decades later. In 1938, Mutual started rebroadcasting news reports from the BBC and English-language newscasts from the European mainland. The network also began employing its own reporters in Europe as the continent headed toward crisis, including John Steele, Waverley Root, Arthur Mann, and Victor Lusinchi. Among these was Sigrid Schultz, the first accomplished female foreign correspondent to appear on American news radio.

1940s: One of the "Big Four"
Early in 1940, the corporate organization of Mutual became even more inclusive, as described by scholar Cornelia B. Rose:
Until January, 1940, six groups bore the expense of the network operation in varying degree: stations WGN and WOR owned all the stock of the corporation and guaranteed to make up any deficit; the Colonial Network in New England, the Don Lee System on the Pacific Coast, and the group of stations owned by the Cleveland Plain Dealer, participated in responsibility for running expenses. A new contract effective February 1, 1940, provides for contributing membership by all the above group[s] plus station CKLW in Detroit-Windsor. These groups now agree to underwrite expenses and become stockholders in the network.... An operating board for the network is  representatives from each of these groups, together with additional representation appointed by other affiliated stations.

The new cooperative structure was also joined by the owners of WKRC in Cincinnati, which had replaced Mutual cofounder WLW in that market. The Mutual corporation now had 100 shares, apportioned as follows:

In 1941, WOR's official city of license was changed to New York. Within two years, the Colonial Network's affiliate roster and shares in Mutual had been fully absorbed into the Yankee Network by John Shepard III; WNAC was the sole flagship, WAAB having been moved to Worcester, in central Massachusetts, to avoid duopoly restrictions. With WBZ taking over the slot as the NBC Red affiliate in Boston, WNAC switched to Mutual. In January 1943, the Federal Communications Commission (FCC) approved the sale of the Yankee Network—with WNAC, its three other owned-and-operated stations, its contracts with 17 additional affiliates, and its Mutual shares—to the Ohio-based General Tire and Rubber Company.

By 1940, Mutual was already on a par with the industry leaders in terms of affiliate roster size. Still, because Mutual affiliates were mostly in small markets or lesser stations in large ones, the network lagged way behind in advertising revenue—NBC took in eleven times as much as Mutual that year. In 1941, the FCC, calling for NBC to divest one of its two networks, observed that the company "has utilized the Blue to forestall competition with the Red .... Mutual is excluded from, or only lamely admitted to, many important markets." On January 10, 1942, Mutual filed a $10.275 million suit against NBC and its parent company, RCA, alleging a conspiracy "hindering and restricting Mutual freely and fairly to compete in the transmission in interstate commerce of nationwide network programs." The FCC's Supreme Court victory in 1943 led to the sale of the Blue Network and Mutual dropping its lawsuit.

These developments appear to have been of more symbolic than practical value to Mutual—the transfer of the NBC Blue stations to the new American Broadcasting Company did little to help Mutual's competitive position. In 1945 it reached 384 affiliates, and by December 1948, Mutual Broadcasting was heard on more than 500 stations in the United States. But this growth did not reflect any ability on Mutual's part to attract leading stations from the corporate-controlled networks. Rather, the FCC had eased its technical standards for local stations, facilitating the establishment of new outlets in small markets: between 1945 and 1952, the number of AM stations rose from around 940 to more than 2,350. It was these new, relatively weak stations Mutual kept picking up. Though by now it had many more affiliates than any other U.S. radio network, for the most part they remained "less desirable in frequency, power, and coverage," as the Supreme Court had put it. For instance, in the postwar era CBS and NBC covered all of North Carolina each with only four stations. Mutual needed fourteen affiliates to deliver comparable statewide coverage.

Late in the decade, there was a brief exploration into the idea of launching a Mutual television network, serious enough to prompt talks with Metro-Goldwyn-Mayer as a potential source of programming talent. In fact, Bamberger Broadcasting's WOR-TV and WOIC (the latter a Washington, D.C. video outlet) maintained letterhead with "Mutual Television" decorating their identifications. Beyond this, there is no confirmation, however, that a cooperative video service was ever seriously considered. The plans never got off the ground and Mutual thus became the only one of the "Big Four" U.S. radio networks not to start (and eventually be dominated by) a television network. While there was no Mutual TV network, this did not mean the group did not have an influence over commercial television's early development. Several Mutual radio affiliates launched their own television stations that would often be affiliated with the television networks of ABC, NBC, CBS or DuMont.

The cooperative also held the rights to a number of valuable radio properties that made the transition to the new medium, including two of the era's most popular variations on what would later become known as the tabloid talk show and "reality" programming: the crabby gabfest Leave It to the Girls and, in particular, Queen for a Day, which both started on Mutual radio in 1945. Referred to by some as a "misery show," Queen for a Day "awarded prizes to women who could come up with the most heart-stabbing stories told by the sick and the downtrodden .... On one show, a mother of nine requested a washing machine to replace one that broke when it fell on her husband and disabled him—and who, by the way, also needed heart surgery." In May 1947, a simulcast version began airing on the Don Lee system's experimental TV station in Los Angeles, W6XAO (later KTSL). It was a smash hit, and by the turn of the decade TV stations all along the coast were broadcasting it to high ratings. In the 1950s, Mutual would stare down NBC for four years as the mighty network sought to take control of the show.

Programming: World War II and Superman

Offscreen, Mutual remained an enterprising broadcaster. In 1940, a program featuring Cedric Foster joined Mutual's respected schedule of news and opinion shows. Foster's claim to fame was as the first daytime commentator to be heard nationally on a daily basis. The network aired that year's NFL Championship Game on December 8, the first national broadcast of the annual event. Over the following half-decade, Mutual's war coverage held its own with that of the wealthier networks, featuring field correspondents such as Henry Shapiro and Piet Van T Veer and commentators such as Cecil Brown, formerly of CBS. At 2:26 p.m. Eastern time, on Sunday, December 7, 1941, Mutual flagship station WOR interrupted a football game broadcast with a news flash reporting the Japanese attack on Pearl Harbor. It was the first public announcement of the attack heard on the U.S. mainland. The first bombs had dropped 63 minutes earlier. In May 1945, Sigrid Schultz reported from one of the last Nazi concentration camps to be discovered, Ravensbrück. The following month, Meet the Press premiered with Martha Rountree as moderator. For a year and a half in the late 1940s, William Shirer came over from CBS to do current events commentary after his famous falling out with Edward Murrow. In 1948, Mutual's four-part series To Secure These Rights, dramatizing the findings of President Truman's Committee on Civil Rights, outraged many politicians and the network's own affiliates in the segregated South.

In the field of entertainment, Mutual built on the incomparable success of The Shadow. WGN's Chicago Theater of the Air, featuring hour-long opera and musical theater productions before a live audience, was broadcast for the first time in May 1940. By 1943, the weekly show was being recorded in front of houses 4,000 strong, gathered to see performances featuring a full orchestra and chorus. Chicago Theater of the Air would run on Mutual through March 1955. Mutual provided an early national outlet for the influential, iconoclastic satirist Henry Morgan, whose show Here's Morgan began its network run in October 1940. Though The Lone Ranger moved over to NBC Blue in May 1942, within a few months Mutual had another reliable, and no less famous, action hero. The Adventures of Superman, picked up from WOR, would run on the network from August 1942 to June 1949. In April 1943, Mutual launched what would turn into one of its longest-lasting shows: debuting as The Return of Nick Carter and later retitled Nick Carter, Master Detective, it would be a network staple through September 1955. From May 1943 through May 1946, Mutual aired The New Adventures of Sherlock Holmes starring Basil Rathbone and Nigel Bruce, reprising their roles from the Universal film series. An earlier incarnation of the show had run briefly on the network in 1936; a less starry version would return to Mutual from September 1947 through June 1949. The Mysterious Traveler, a proto–Twilight Zone anthology series, aired every week on Mutual from December 1943 until September 1952.

In February 1946, Mutual introduced a quiz show, Twenty Questions, that would run for more than seven years. In October, the detective series Let George Do It, starring Bob Bailey, launched as a Mutual/Don Lee presentation; it would also run into the mid-1950s. For two years, starting in 1946 as well, Steve Allen got his first network exposure on the Mutual/Don Lee morning show Smile Time, out of Los Angeles's KHJ. In February 1947, the religiously oriented Family Theater premiered; with frequent appearances by major Hollywood stars, the series aired on Mutual for ten and a half years. That March, Kate Smith, a major star on CBS since 1931, moved over to Mutual. During most of her initial run at the network, which lasted until September 1951, she had two distinct weekday shows, each 15 minutes long: Kate Smith Speaks, at noon, and Kate Smith Sings, later in the hour. The network gave an outlet to radio dramatist Wyllis Cooper and his highly regarded suspense anthology Quiet, Please, which ran on Mutual from June 1947 to September 1948. It also aired actor Alan Ladd's similarly lauded drama about a crime-solving mystery novelist, Box 13, which ran for precisely a year. Its 52 episodes, which aired every Sunday beginning August 22, 1948, were produced by Ladd's own company, Mayfair Productions.

1950s: New ownership

General Tire asserts control, then sells 

Toward the end of 1950, the executors of the estate of Thomas S. Lee (the son of Don Lee, who had died in 1934) liquidated the estate's broadcasting interests. The Don Lee Broadcasting System and its shares in Mutual was sold to General Tire for $12.3 million (equivalent to $ in ), which already had a sizable stake in Mutual via the Yankee Network. The sale prompted a challenge by Edwin W. Pauley, who led a failed bid for the group, claiming it violated Mutual bylaws stating no group could hold more than 25 percent of network stock. General Tire retained KHJ, KFRC and KGB, divesting the other stations. At the same time, Mutual acquired the television broadcast rights to the World Series and All-Star Game for the next six years. Mutual was likely re-indulging in TV network dreams or was simply taking advantage of a long-standing business relationship; in either case, Mutual sold the broadcast rights to NBC in time for the following season's games at an enormous profit.

Early in 1952, General Tire purchased General Teleradio from R.H. Macy and Company. With the deal, General Tire acquired the WOR radio and TV stations and the rights to the General Teleradio brand, under which the company merged its broadcasting interests as a new division (Bamberger had previously sold its TV station in the nation's capital, WOIC, to CBS and the Washington Post). Most importantly, WOR's founding shares in Mutual, when added to the Yankee and Don Lee holdings, gave General Tire majority control of the network. General Tire head Thomas F. O'Neil, who had already taken over as president of the Don Lee stations, became president of Mutual in an executive shakeup.

While Mutual did not have a television network, it held rights to one of the most profitable shows in the medium: an early adaptation of Queen for a Day on General Teleradio/Don Lee's KHJ-TV boasted an audience triple that of the city's six other television stations combined. It was also the largest U.S. radio network in affiliate numbers, by far—it had around 560, almost three times as many as its most powerful competitors, CBS (194) and NBC (191). Still, the radio industry started to feel effects of major advertisers abandoning radio for television, with commercial rates being cut among all four networks, Mutual included. O'Neil proposed a barter-style restructuring at a July 1953 affiliates' conference in Cape Cod, Massachusetts, called "The Cape Cod Plan": the network would provide five hours of sponsored programming daily and 14 hours of additional programming weekly that affiliates could sell commercial time for. The "Cape Cod Plan" eventually met with resistance from the affiliates, some of which saw it as an attempt by Mutual to make money at their expense; by the time of the next affiliates' conference in January 1954, O'Neil called the barter plan "dead".

In 1955, General Tire expanded its media holdings by acquiring RKO Pictures from Howard Hughes, renaming General Teleradio as RKO Teleradio Pictures. The next year, a Canadian subsidiary of RKO purchased a governing interest in Mutual shareholder, Western Ontario Broadcasting, owner of CKLW; when the deal closed, two of Western Ontario Broadcasting's directors were U.S. citizens. RKO Teleradio Pictures also purchased Washington, D.C. station WGMS-AM-FM in April 1956, with WGMS joining Mutual. Closing the movie studio a year and a half later, the broadcasting division was renamed RKO Teleradio in 1957, and again to RKO General in 1958. The "Mutual Dealer Plan", another attempt to revamp the network's operations containing elements of the barter-style "Cape Cod Plan", was unveiled to affiliates at an April 1956 conference to favorable reception. The plan, however, could not prevent two remaining minority shareholders in Mutual from leaving: United Broadcasting's WHK switched to NBC in July, while founding station WGN became an independent on August 31, 1956, with ABC/Prairie Farmer-owned WLS becoming Mutual's Chicago affiliate.

By this point, Mutual was foundering. Even with the "Mutual Dealer Plan" and staff cutbacks, the network suffered a loss of $400,000 (equivalent to $ in ) in 1956. In early July 1957, advertisers were notified the network could end operations at the end of the month, one of three options General Tire was considering for Mutual. Another option—spinning off Mutual while retaining the stations that had given it control—was ultimately taken, as a group led by Dr. Armand Hammer bought the network later in the month. Limited sponsorship packages were also introduced in which an advertiser could back a show for an abbreviated period rather than an entire season, but there was no reversing the trend of television usurping radio. The radio networks were left with the bills for an increasing number of sustaining programs, which had no sponsors. The loss of mainstay advertisers was accompanied by what historian Ronald Garay describes as the "mass desertion of network radio talent, management and technicians for television .... [T]hese people were taking with them the programming that had popularized the radio networks."

Turmoil, propaganda allegations, and bankruptcy 

The network soon changed hands again: in September 1958, it was acquired by the Scranton Corporation for $2 million (equivalent to $ in ). Scranton was under the control of the F. L. Jacobs Company, whose chairman, Alexander Guterma, envisioned a media empire uniting Mutual with another recent purchase, Hal Roach Studios. Guterma's tenure as Mutual president was brief: he resigned on February 13, 1959, amid increasing financial shortfalls, overdue payments to affiliates, unpaid phone bills with AT&T, and an ongoing investigation by the U.S. Securities and Exchange Commission (SEC). Hal Roach Jr. took over as president, but the SEC labeled him "a Guterma puppet" due to how he assumed Guterma's shares and questioned his ability to run the network. A week after resigning, the SEC indicted Guterma on federal securities fraud charges which led Roach to be removed as president of the film studio, though he retained his position as Mutual president. The SEC also ordered stock trading for the F. L. Jacobs Company suspended.

Scranton was under pressure to sell Mutual. The March 9, 1959, issue of Broadcasting magazine stated Mutual had a deficit of $1.05 million (equivalent to $ in ) and was losing up to $100,000 a month. AT&T threatened to cut off Mutual's telephone service within 24 hours if all outstanding charges were not paid, which would sever the network from its affiliates. An attempt to sell the network to Max Factor collapsed after the cosmetics manufacturer could not find a way to create a tax advantage from the existing financial losses. When AT&T made another threat to disconnect phone service, network news director Robert F. Hurleigh engineered a last-minute deal with businessman Malcolm Smith, whose transaction to buy the network included $1 million of advertising time and payment of the outstanding AT&T phone bill, which totaled over $400,000. The deal, however, failed to stop KALL in Salt Lake City and its 41-station regional "Intermountain Network" from switching to ABC. The Don Lee Network folded on April 26, with all 20 affiliates switching from Mutual to ABC and ABC purchasing Don Lee's remaining programming. Yankee Network lead station WNAC severed ties with Mutual in August to become independent, but Mutual was allowed to affiliate with the other Yankee stations individually. 

The troubles with Mutual worsened. While on a press junket to Ciudad Trujillo in May 1959, Hurleigh received confirmation that Dominican Republic dictator Rafael Trujillo secretly provided money to Guterma, Roach and Scranton Corp. vice president Garland Culpepper. Guterma accepted up to $750,000 from Trujillo, and in turn, Mutual newscasts were to have up to 425 minutes of puff pieces favorable to Trujillo's regime broadcast per month. One story read by Walter Winchell regarded plans by Hal Roach Studios to film future movies in the country, while another story about Castro allies planning attacks against the Trujillo regime was read by Fulton Lewis Jr.; assorted "news releases" were also sent intended for newscasts but never broadcast. Outraged over the arrangement, Hurleigh went to the U.S. Justice Department, which also received a complaint from a Trujillo lawyer after Guterma failed to give the money back. By September, Guterma was indicted for failing to register as a foreign agent, with Roach and Culpepper as defendants. Guterma, who pleaded no contest to the charge, was sentenced to federal prison for stock fraud, but it was never proven that he actually fulfilled his part of the deal and arranged for slanted coverage. Nonetheless, the incident, combined with the network's precarious financial position, led to a reported 130 stations ending their Mutual affiliations.

In the wake of the Trujillo scandal and affiliate defections, Smith sold Mutual to Hurleigh for $1 on July 1, 1959, which was followed by a voluntary Chapter 11 bankruptcy filing. Businessman Albert G. McCarthy took over operations, arranging to settle the network's over $3 million in debts (equivalent to $ in ) while seeking an owner interested in running it on an ongoing basis. WOR signed a new contract with Mutual despite previously indicating the station would drop the network, becoming the lone RKO Teleradio station to renew ties as WGMS, KFRC, KHJ and WHBQ joined WNAC in independence. At the same time, WOR started to identify as "WOR-AM-FM, owned by RKO General," eschewing on-air mentions of Mutual after listeners mistakenly thought WOR was also in bankruptcy; concurrently, Mutual changed their station cue to "the Network of Independent Stations". A three-part reorganization plan resolving all debts was approved in bankruptcy court on December 23, 1959, allowing Mutual to emerge from Chapter 11; a network spokesperson commented, "this means we start out with a clean slate; we are now divorced from any previous managements."

The Korean War and original drama's decline 

Before the Guterma fiasco, the network had maintained its reputation for running a strong and respected news organization. As the conflict on the Korean peninsula began to escalate in mid-1950, Mutual began airing two special nightly reports on the situation, featuring the commentary of Major George Fielding Eliot, military analyst for CBS during World War II. By August 1950, Mutual was represented by six correspondents in Korea, more than NBC or ABC. On occasion, Mutual's commentary programs made the news: On March 11, 1954, Fulton Lewis Jr. featured Senator Joseph McCarthy as his guest, two days after the senator's ethics had been called into question on the CBS TV show See It Now, hosted by Edward R. Murrow. In his radio interview, McCarthy dismissed Murrow as "the extreme left-wing, bleeding-heart element of television." In 1957, Mutual refused to air an episode of Clarence Manion's Manion Forum featuring Herbert V. Kohler Sr. due to controversy over the Kohler strikes.

Mutual began the 1950s by entering the realm of adult science fiction with 2000 Plus on March 15, 1950, almost a month before NBC premiered the similarly themed Dimension X. The network picked up adventure series Challenge of the Yukon from ABC Radio, which originated at Mutual cofounder WXYZ in 1938 (but after the station left the network). Renamed Sergeant Preston of the Yukon, this show launched on Mutual on July 10, 1951. A partnership with Metro-Goldwyn-Mayer at the end of 1951 had the film studio supply up to six hours of programming per week starting in 1952 with The MGM Theater of the Air as its centerpiece, but the programs lasted for only one year. Another established drama, Phillips H. Lord's Counterspy, moved to Mutual in 1953 after a prior run on ABC. The network's other new offerings in 1953 were a further sign of the times—transcription reruns of Coke Time with Eddie Fisher (utilizing soundtracks from Fisher's NBC-TV show) and an audio simulcast of CBS-TV's Perry Como Chesterfield Show. The Shadows long run finally ended in December 1954, followed by Sergeant Preston in June 1955. Gang Busters, another Lord serial which had runs on ABC, CBS and NBC throughout the 1940s and early 1950s, moved to Mutual in October 1955. In November 1957, the final episodes of Counterspy and Gang Busters aired, ending the network's last two remaining half-hour original dramatic shows. Mutual had forsworn the genre and would not broadcast a new dramatic series until 1973 with the short-lived Rod Serling vehicle The Zero Hour.

In 1955, the famous comedy team Bob and Ray came over from NBC for a five-day-a-week afternoon show. Kate Smith returned in January 1958 for her final radio series, which ran until August. In June 1958, just a few months before the Scranton takeover, the network had launched a nightly 25-minute newscast, The World Today, hosted by Westbrook Van Voorhis, famous as the voice of The March of Time. Sports began to occupy an increasing portion of Mutual's schedule: the network began regularly airing a Major League Baseball Game of the Day, every day except Sunday. This expansion into daily sports programming would run well into the 1960s. While baseball's World Series and All-Star Game would go to rival NBC in 1957, Mutual secured national radio rights to Notre Dame Fighting Irish football in 1954. The rights would switch between networks over the following decade before Mutual became the exclusive broadcaster in 1968, which would remain a cornerstone for the rest of the network's existence.

1960s–1970s: Narrowed focus

From 3M to Amway 
In the spring of 1960, the 3M Company stepped in, purchasing Mutual and restoring much-needed stability to the operation. Despite the late 1950s Guterma scandal, Mutual still had 443 affiliates, easily the most of any network. By this time, as historian Jim Cox describes, both Mutual and ABC "had largely wiped their slates clean of most of their network programming—save news and sporting events and a few long-running features". This would characterize Mutual's essential approach for the next three and a half decades, through a further series of ownership changes.

In July 1966, 3M sold the network to the privately held Mutual Industries, Inc., headed by John P. Fraim and Loren M. Berry, for $3.1 million (equivalent to $ in ); Fraim was vice-president of Berry's Dayton, Ohio–based telephone directory publishing company. Upon Mutual Industries's acquisition of Mutual, it was renamed to "Mutual Broadcasting Corporation". The following month, after the death of Mutual stalwart Fulton Lewis Jr., his son Fulton Lewis III took over his nightly 7 p.m. slot. Another Ohio businessman, Daniel H. Overmyer, sought a merger with Mutual in 1967 amid plans to start his own TV network. The offer was rebuffed, but three Mutual stockholders joined eleven other investors to buy Overmyer's hookup and rename it the United Network. The network and its only offering, The Las Vegas Show, folded after only a month on the air.

When ABC Radio "split" into four demographically targeted networks on January 1, 1968, Mutual unsuccessfully sued to block the move. Meanwhile, the network was undergoing some management instability, with frequent changes at the top: for example, Matthew J. Culligan was Mutual's president from October 1966 to June 1968. He was replaced by Robert R. Pauley, who came over from the ABC radio division, where he had served as president for nearly seven years. But Pauley only lasted a year, and resigned after clashes with the board over the need for cost-cutting, and other decisions with which he disagreed. His replacement was Victor C. Diehm, owner of several Mutual-affiliated radio stations and active on the Mutual Affiliates Advisory Council.Diehm was succeeded early in 1972 by C. Edward Little, a former executive and owner of Hollywood, Florida, Mutual affiliate WGMA. Little arrived in the position with a commitment to expand Mutual's news service and program offerings, conceding that Mutual had long been fourth among the legacy "big four" radio networks. Taking a page from ABC's move to split its radio network years earlier, Little launched two additional news services, the Mutual Black Network (MBN) and the Mutual Spanish Network (Mutual Cadena Hispánica) on May 1, 1972. Targeting Black audiences, MBN supplied 100 five-minute-long news and sports reports weekly along with other programming, with Mutual Cadena featuring similar fare aimed at Spanish-language listeners. By July 1972, Mutual had 550 affiliates, MBN had 55 and Mutual Cadena had 21. While Mutual Cadena lasted only six months, by 1974 MBN grew to 98 affiliates.

Another change in July 1974 was more subtle—Mutual began using two-toned "Mutualert" network cue tones at the beginning and end of newscasts, programs, between commercials and during network identification breaks. Referred to as "bee-doops", these cue tones would be used by Mutual for the rest of its existence. The youth-oriented Mutual Progressive News was launched for Top 40 and country outlets and was also made available for non-commercial educational stations in markets without an existing Mutual affiliate. Little later oversaw the 1978 launch of the Mutual Southwest Network, a regional "mininetwork" that handled distribution for the Dallas Cowboys Radio Network and featured Southwest Conference football games. In 1976, 49 percent of MBN ownership was sold to the Sheridan Broadcasting Corporation followed by the remaining 51 percent in 1979, at which point MBN was renamed the Sheridan Broadcasting Network and later merged into National Black Network to create American Urban Radio Networks.

While Mutual Broadcasting Corp. was initially a group controlled by Fraim and Berry, investor Benjamin D. Gilbert and his wife quietly bought out their stakes and that of the other investors, becoming the principal owners. The Gilberts would attract unwanted attention for themselves over one particular program. In 1974, the Liberty Lobby, a think tank and lobby group that espoused far-right views and antisemitism, purchased airtime for a daily five-minute show, This Is Liberty Lobby, which also offered the organization's "America First" pamphlet at the end of every episode. While not directly from Mutual, it was made available to the network's over 600 stations, with 126 carrying it by July. The Anti-Defamation League alleged the Mutual connection came as the Gilberts personally contributed thousands of dollars to the Liberty Lobby since 1966. After refusing to transmit two specific episodes in November, Mutual cancelled the Liberty Lobby contract at year's end.

In the March 21, 1977, issue of Broadcasting magazine, publisher John P. McGoff disclosed he had been in talks to purchase Mutual. A bidding war followed between Amway, a multi-level marketing company known for selling home care products, and Columbus, Georgia–based insurer American Family Corp., which dropped out after the asking price approached $20 million (equivalent to $ in ). On September 30, 1977, Amway bought the network. After the purchase, Mutual began to develop what would become the first nationwide commercial broadcast satellite network, leading to the end of decades of reliance on telephone lines for the broadcast industry's transmission capacity. This proposal received FCC approval in late 1979. The biggest change to Mutual happened in 1978, when Amway purchased WCFL from the Chicago Federation of Labor for $12 million (equivalent to $ in ); for the first time, the network founded by radio stations directly owned a station of its own, and in one of the country's largest markets. Mutual also reached its greatest number of affiliates that year with 950, fewer than ABC—whose multipronged approach had proven very successful—but far in front of NBC and CBS.

Rise of the call-in talk show 

One of the few primary network programs outside of news and sports that Mutual initiated during this era, rapidly became one of the most successful in its history—the first nationwide, all-night call-in talk radio program, which launched on November 3, 1975, with Herb Jepko as host. Jepko's show, which originated from KSL in Salt Lake City in 1964 as Nitecap, was fed by Mutual for eight hours beginning at midnight ET, allowing for stations on the West Coast to carry it live. Mutual also signed up 12 high-powered AM stations to ensure coast-to-coast reception. Jepko so determinedly avoided controversial topics on the program that some callers simply talked about the weather where they lived. Fellow broadcaster Hilly Rose said of Jepko, "he is the exact opposite of Joe Pyne and 99% of the successful talk show hosts in America. If (he) were any nicer, he would make Mary Poppins look like a witch."

Mutual dropped Jepko's show in May 1977, replacing it with the husband and wife team Long John Nebel and Candy Jones from WMCA in New York City, whose program fared little better than Jepko's. Nebel and Jones left Mutual by the end of the year and Mutual then hired a virtually unknown local talk show host at WIOD in Miami: Larry King. On January 30, 1978, the Larry King Show made its national debut on Mutual. Initially heard over 28 stations, by late 1979, King's all-night program became increasingly popular, carried by nearly 200 stations with a nightly audience of around 2 million listeners. During the early 1980s, the Larry King Show continued to attract new affiliates to the network. Like Jepko, King also shied away from controversial subjects on the show, with regular callers to the show being given pseudonyms or nicknames by King himself.

Originally a five-and-a-half hour program, the last half hour was relaunched as America in The Morning, a morning news magazine hosted by WCFL alumnus Jim Bohannon, in September 1984. King continued with his Mutual call-in show until 1994, long after he began hosting Larry King Live for CNN in 1985. King's success soon prompted NBC Radio and ABC Radio to launch NBC Talknet and ABC TalkRadio, respectively, both featured call-in shows airing into the late-evening and overnight hours. The Larry King Show also won a Peabody Award for Mutual in 1982.

Mutual made additional ventures beyond talk programming and newscasts. Along with the network's existing sports coverage, Mutual was the national radio broadcaster for Monday Night Football from 1970 through 1977. Mutual began nationally distributing Jamboree USA from WWVA in Wheeling, West Virginia, on February 23, 1979, marking the first time in years that the network featured a regularly scheduled live music program. Jamboree USA also became the first music program on radio to be transmitted by satellite; the new technology now further enabled Mutual to offer additional music programming to affiliates, including anthologies and concerts.

1980s–1990s: The end of Mutual

Joining up with Westwood One 

With their purchase of WCFL still pending, Amway acquired a second station for Mutual with New York City's WHN from Storer Broadcasting on February 26, 1979, for $14 million (equivalent to $ in ), at the time the second-highest purchase price for a radio station. Supplanting WMCA as Mutual's New York outlet, the deal closed on March 3, 1980. Re-branded "Mutual/CFL", WCFL was relaunched in August 1979 as the flagship for Mutual Lifestyle Radio, a form of talk radio oriented towards light conversation. On a Country Road, a country music show hosted by WHN's Lee Arnold, was given national distribution. Also in March 1980, Mutual picked up the Sears Radio Theater after CBS Radio dropped it, renaming it Mutual Radio Theater. While a number of well-regarded episodes were produced, the series ended on December 19, 1980, and was Mutual's final radio drama. The Mutual Southwest Network also closed at the end of 1980; in both cases, Mutual Radio Theater and Mutual Southwest suffered from a lack of advertising support.

In 1981, Mutual launched Dick Clark's National Music Survey, a three-hour-long weekly program combining music and interviews, a show Clark continued to host for even after having co-founded a competing syndicator, United Stations Radio Networks, earlier in the year. Sports commentaries were added featuring the likes of Tommy Lasorda and Pat Summerall, along with hourly "Wide Weekend of Sports" sportscasts throughout the weekend; the network also held play-by-play rights to Notre Dame college football, the PGA Tour, the LPGA, the United States Tennis Association and regional rights for four NFL teams.

Mutual's satellite network was fully online by 1982, but the new technology allowed for additional networks to emerge, some—including efforts from NBC, ABC, CBS, RKO, Satellite Music Network and Transtar—providing continuous programming to radio stations on a "turnkey" basis. WCFL also failed to meet the network's expectations. Chuck Swirsky, hired as an evening sports talk host, later called WCFL "... the lowest rated 50-thousand watts station in American broadcast history. We had blank pages for logs. Zero commercial inventory. Any PSA content our traffic department received we immediately played on the air that night." As Mutual celebrated its 50th anniversary, Amway denied rumors of a possible sale but executive Richard DeVos admitted the company was disappointed with their venture into broadcasting, calling Mutual "a learning experience" and their stewardship of WCFL "not a very good one ... I began to question whether our people really knew how to run a radio station". Network president John Brian Clements asserted "this network is not for sale", but the radio stations were: WCFL was sold to Statewide Broadcasting in November 1983 at a $4 million loss and WHN was sold to Doubleday Broadcasting in October 1984 at a $1 million loss. Clements took over as president when Amway's board called for the resignation of several executives and followed downsizing due to "softening sales".

In 1985, Westwood One, a radio production company and syndicator based in Culver City, California, sought to expand its operations. Westwood and Mutual were a good match: the demographics of Mutual affiliates tended to be adult, while most of the stations that bought Westwood's music-oriented programming had substantially younger audiences. Mutual had news operations Westwood lacked, and although down from its peak, still commanded 860 affiliates and generated $25 million in revenue, a strong second among the Big Four. In September 1985, Amway sold the network to Westwood One for $39 million (equivalent to $ in ) outside of the satellite services division and uplink facility, which Amway retained. "It's a perfect fit," declared Westwood head Norman J. Pattiz. Referring to the united company's ability to give advertisers access to a broad demographic sweep, he called it "a classic case of two plus two equaling five." On July 20, 1987, the number got even bigger: Westwood One snapped up the NBC Radio Network for $50 million (equivalent to $ in ), pursing Mutual's long-time competitor since a planned sale of the network and NBC's radio stations to Westinghouse Broadcasting fell through.

Mutual was now part of a much larger programming service, and its identity was being gradually phased out. In 1987, Mutual's longform fare, including Larry King and Toni Grant, were placed in a new service called "Mutual P.M.", which Westwood One touted as "clon(ing) a new network from the existing network" in hopes of attracting new advertisers. NBC Radio's news and engineering staff was combined with Mutual personnel at the Arlington facility in 1989, and by 1992, programming between the two networks began to undergo consolidation, particularly in overnights and weekends. King switched his all-night radio show to a shorter daytime version on February 1, 1993, with the late-night slot going to Jim Bohannon; in addition to hosting America in The Morning, Bohannon had been King's fill-in host and hosted a weekend call-in show on Mutual identical to King's. King's daytime show ended in June 1994 and was replaced with a talk show hosted by comedian David Brenner, which lasted for two years. Westwood One began simulcasting the television audio of King's nightly CNN talk show Larry King Live, which continued through the end of 2009. Outside of Bohannon's show, most Mutual programming was now being heard on smaller market stations, with many affiliates using it as a "backup" to a different primary affiliation; by 1999, Mutual News was down to approximately 300 affiliates.

Consolidation, streamlining and dissolution 
Meanwhile, Westwood One began to be subject to larger mergers and acquisitions. Westwood One purchased competing syndicator Unistar Radio Networks from Infinity Broadcasting in 1994; as part of the deal, Infinity purchased 25 percent of Westwood One, becoming its largest shareholder and effectively taking it over. Westinghouse, which recently bought out CBS and was renamed CBS Corporation shortly thereafter, then acquired Infinity in June 1996 for just shy of $5 billion (equivalent to $ in ). The direct descendants of the three original U.S. radio network companies had merged, with Mutual little more than one of several brand names for programming under the aegis of Westwood One, itself under the control of a major conglomerate. Mutual and NBC Radio newscasters sat back to back in the Westwood One studio, the former main Mutual facility in Crystal City, Virginia, which now also fed CBS Radio News from New York City and CNN Radio feeds—which Westwood One also distributed—from Atlanta; despite newsroom signage still reading "Mutual Broadcasting System" as late as 1998, it was referred to internally as "the Westwood One newsroom". The newsroom itself closed on August 31, 1998, with Mutual and NBC newscasts originating from the CBS Radio News facilities.

In early 1999, Westwood One announced that it would retire the Mutual name and end newscast production, with CNN Radio, CBS or Fox News Radio offered as replacements to affiliates. The majority of NBC Radio's remaining services would also cease outside of morning drive hours. In addition to producing NBC, CBS and Mutual newscasts and distributing CNN content, Westwood One also began distributing Fox News; as a result, the company was marketing five different newscast brands in what one company representative called "wasteful".  A former staffer for Mutual's news service described the end: "Official time of Mutual Radio's death was Midnight 4/17/99. No tribute, no mention it was the last newscast ... it just died." The closure of Mutual News resulted in 12 staffers being dismissed from CBS Radio News, which itself underwent a recent series of cutbacks involving on-air talent.

While the dropping of the Mutual name was attributed to mass consolidation, in particular following passage of the 1996 Telecommunications Act, Dick Rosse, a correspondent for the network for 36 years before retiring in 1998, said the following in an op-ed for Broadcasting & Cable:

The Crystal City facility was closed in March 2001, with Westwood One's primary operations transferred to the CBS Broadcast Center in New York City.

Legacy 
Westwood One's corporate fate proved almost as complicated as the fate of Mutual itself. Spun off by majority owner CBS Corporation (one of two successors to the first Viacom, which acquired the first CBS Corporation in 1999) to The Gores Group in 2007, it was merged into Dial Global—a subsidiary of Oaktree Capital Management's Triton Media Group unit—in 2011, ultimately taking that company's name. Prior to its 2013 merger into Cumulus Media Networks, Dial Global reverted to using the Westwood One name. Even with all these changes, some current programming both on Westwood One (owned by Cumulus Media) and other syndicators can still trace their lineage directly to Mutual:

Jim Bohannon's interview/call-in show, which debuted on Mutual in 1985 (and was a direct descendant of Larry King and Herb Jepko's shows), continued until his abrupt retirement on October 14, 2022. Rich Valdés took over hosting duties for the program. Bohannon missed much of the summer of 2022 for what were initially unexplained reasons but later revealed to be a diagnosis with terminal stage 4 esophageal cancer, and died  after his final show. Bohannon also hosted the morning news magazine America in the Morning from its 1984 premiere over Mutual until 2015; which continues to this day as a Westwood One program under succeeding host John Trout.

Since 2004, the current incarnation of Meet the Press, first broadcast over Mutual in 1945, has had an audio simulcast over Westwood One. Country Countdown USA, founded in 1992 as a Mutual-branded program after the Westwood One purchase, continues to air in its original format but moved to Compass Media Networks in August 2022. Radio broadcasts of Notre Dame Fighting Irish football were eventually re-branded as from Westwood One a few years before the end of the Mutual network itself. At the conclusion of the 2007 football season, Notre Dame ended its relationship with Westwood One, citing financial reasons, and subsequently announced a deal with ISP Sports.

After taking over Westwood One in 2013, Cumulus Media launched a white-label news service, Westwood One News under a content-sharing deal with CNN. Launching on January 1, 2015, as a replacement service among Cumulus's radio stations that previously affiliated with ABC News Radio, CBS News Radio and NBC News Radio (the latter having replaced CNN Radio in 2012), it ended operations on August 30, 2020.

Mutual founding stations WOR and WLW are now both owned by iHeartMedia, who operates their own syndication unit, Premiere Networks. Prior to being purchased by iHeartMedia in 2012 (as Clear Channel Communications), WOR operated a syndication service of their own, the WOR Radio Network. The other founding station, WGN, is owned by television broadcaster Nexstar Media Group as the lone radio station in their portfolio. WGN previously syndicated Orion Samuelson farm reports through its Tribune Radio Network, which carried Chicago Cubs broadcasts until the 2014 season.

Awards and honors 
The Mutual Broadcasting System has been the recipient of the following Peabody Awards:

 1941 Peabody Award: Outstanding Achievement in Music—Alfred Wallenstein (co-honored with WOR)
 1944 Peabody Award: Outstanding Educational Program—Human Adventure
 1946 Peabody Award Honorable Mention: Meet the Press
 1950 Peabody Award Honorable Mention: Contribution to International Understanding—Pursuit of Peace (co-honored with United Nations Radio)
 1956 Peabody Award: The Bob and Ray Show (co-honored with NBC)
 1982 Peabody Award: The Larry King Show
 1987 Peabody Award: Charities That Give and Take

See also

Notable programs 
Shows heard over the Mutual Broadcasting System during the "Golden Age of Radio" included the following:

Abbott Mysteries, 1945–1947
Adventure Parade, 1946–1949
The Adventures of Champion, 1949
The Adventures of Father Brown, 1945
The Adventures of Maisie, 1952
The Adventures of Superman, 1942–1949
The Amazing Nero Wolfe, 1945
A. L. Alexander's Mediation Board, 1943–1952
Archie Andrews, 1944
Arch Oboler's Plays, 1945
The Black Museum, 1952
Blackstone, the Magic Detective, 1948–1949
Captain Midnight, 1940–1942; 1945–1949; 1949
Charlie Chan, 1935–1945 (original series); 1947–1948 (reruns)
Chick Carter, Boy Detective, 1943–1945
The Cisco Kid, 1942–1945; 1946 (regional)
The Couple Next Door, 1937
The Crime Club, 1946–1947
Crime Does Not Pay, 1952
Dick Tracy, 1935–1937
Family Theater, 1947–1957
Hopalong Cassidy, 1950
Hop Harrigan, 1946–1948
I Love a Mystery, 1949–1952
It Pays to Be Ignorant, 1942; 1943–1944
Johnny Modero, Pier 23, 1947
Land of the Lost, 1945–1946
Mandrake the Magician, 1940–1942
Mark Trail, 1950–1951
Martin Kane, Private Eye, 1949–1951
Red Ryder, 1942; 1942–1949 (regional)
Queen for a Day, 1945–1947
The Saint, 1949–1950
The Lone Ranger, 1933–1954
The Sea Hound, 1946–1947
The Sealed Book, 1945
The Shadow, 1937–1954
Sky King, 1950–1954
Skyroads, 1939
The Two Ton Baker Show, 1948–1949
Vic and Sade, 1946
Voyage of the Scarlet Queen, 1947–1948
The Zane Grey Show, 1947–1948

Notable staff 

Jim Bohannon, talk show host
Tom Cheek, sportscaster
Raymond Clapper, commentator
Bud Collyer, actor
Chuck Connors, actor
Dizzy Dean, sportscaster
Gene Elston, sportscaster
Bob Feller, sportscaster
Tex Fletcher, singing cowboy
Eli Gold, sportscaster
Morton Gould, conductor/arranger/pianist
Toni Grant, talk-show host
Ray Heatherton, musical actor
Gabriel Heatter, commentator
Skitch Henderson, conductor/arranger/pianist
Ernest Holmes, religion-show host
Quincy Howe, commentator
Wilbur Budd Hulick, comic actor
Herb Jepko, talk show host
Candy Jones, talk show host
Larry King, talk show host
Fredell Lack, violinist
Fulton Lewis, commentator
Fulton Lewis III, commentator
Tony Marvin, newscaster
Long John Nebel, talk show host
Lindsey Nelson, sportscaster
Van Patrick, sportscaster
Drew Pearson, commentator
Robert Ripley, trivia-show host
Ed Salamon, programming executive
Cesare Sodero, conductor
Bill Stern, sportscaster
Raymond Gram Swing, commentator
Aloysius Michael Sullivan, announcer
Phil Tonken, announcer
Westbrook Van Voorhis, newscaster

Notes

References

Bibliography 

 

Leblebici, Huseyin, Gerald R. Salancik, Anne Copay, and Tom King (1991). "Institutional Change and the Transformation of Interorganizational Fields: An Organizational History of the U.S. Radio Broadcasting Industry," Administrative Science Quarterly (September). ISSN 0001-8392 (available online).

External links
How Far Should the Government Control Radio? text of G.I. Roundtable pamphlet with details on Mutual in first section ("Who Is It That Fills The Air With Radio Waves?"), ca. 1945; part of American Historical Association website
Reporters' Roundup Transcript radio broadcast transcript of group interview with guest U.S. Senator Everett M. Dirksen on weekly Mutual news program, September 16, 1957; part of Everett Dirksen Center website
Truman Library—Charter Heslep Papers summary introduction to and listing of archive holdings of Mutual broadcaster's papers (note that the Collection Description text incorrectly states that Chicago station WLS was an original member of Mutual; while it may have been involved in the predecessor Quality Network, it was not part of Mutual); part of Truman Presidential Museum and Library website

Listening
Gabriel Heatter on the Doolittle Raid audio extract from news report, May 10, 1942; part of Authentic History Center website
Mutual: Blackout on the West Coast audio extract from news report, December 8, 1941; part of Authentic History Center website
Spotlight on Golden Age Networks—MBS links to audio samples of classic Mutual shows (note that the Lone Ranger sample comes from 1948, after the show had left Mutual); part of Digital Deli Online
WOR: Interruption of Giants–Dodgers Football Game audio clip of news flash, December 7, 1941; part of Authentic History Center website

 
Cooperatives in the United States
Defunct radio networks in the United States
Entertainment companies established in 1934
Radio stations established in 1934
Radio stations disestablished in 1999
Mass media companies established in 1934
Companies disestablished in 1999
1934 establishments in the United States
1999 disestablishments in the United States